The 2008–09 Dukat Premijer Liga season is the eighteenth since its establishment.

Teams

League table

2008-09 winning team

RK Croatia Osiguranje Zagreb
GK: Marin Šego, Gorazd Škof, Vjenceslav Somić
LB: Tonči Valčić, Ognjen Backovič
CB: Domagoj Duvnjak, Denis Špoljarić, Josip Valčić, Ivano Balić
RB: Kiril Lazarov, Marko Kopljar
RW: Mirza Džomba, Zlatko Horvat
LW: Mateo Hrvatin, Ljubo Vukić, Manuel Štrlek
LP: Branimir Koloper, Igor Vori
Head coach: Senjanin Maglajlija
Source: archiv.thw-handball.de

References

Sources
HRS
Sport.net.hr
Rk-zamet.hr
Rijeka.hr

Croatian Premier Handball League seasons
2008–09 domestic handball leagues
2009 in Croatian sport
2008 in Croatian sport